Red Hodges was a poker player.  He was inducted into the Poker Hall of Fame in 1985.

Notes

American poker players
Year of birth missing
Year of death missing
Poker Hall of Fame inductees